Biodiversity plays a vital role in maintaining human and animal health. Numerous plants, animals, and fungi are used in medicine, as well as to produce vital vitamins, painkillers, and other things. Natural products have been recognized and used as medicines by ancient cultures all around the world. Many animals are also known to self-medicate using plants and other materials available to them. More than 60% of the world's population relies almost entirely on plant medicine for primary health care.

About 119 pure chemicals are extracted from less than 90 species of higher plants and used as medicines throughout the world, for example, caffeine, methyl salicylate, and quinine.

Antibiotics
Streptomycin, neomycin, and erythromycin are derived from tropical soil fungi.

Plant drugs
A lot of plant species are used in today's studies and have been studied thoroughly for their potential value as a source of drugs. It is possible that some plant species may be a source of drugs against high blood pressure, AIDS, or heart troubles.

In China, Japan, India, and Germany, there is a great deal of interest in and support for the search for new drugs from higher plants.

Sweet wormwood
Each species carries unique genetic material in its DNA and in its chemical factory responding to these genetic instructions.  For example, in the valleys of central China, a fernlike endangered weed called sweet wormwood grows, which is the only source of artemisinin, a drug that is nearly 100 percent effective against malaria.  If this plant were lost to extinction, then the ability to control malaria, even today a potent killer, would diminish.

Zoopharmacognosy

Zoopharmacognosy is the study of how animals use plants, insects, and other inorganic materials in self-medication. For example, apes have been observed selecting a particular part of a medicinal plant by taking off leaves and breaking the stem to suck out the juice.  In an interview with the late Neil Campbell,  Eloy Rodriguez describes the importance of biodiversity:

"Some of the compounds we've identified by zoopharmacognosy kill parasitic worms, and some of these chemicals may be useful against tumors. There is no question that the templates for most drugs are in the natural world."

References

Biodiversity